Omar Torri (born 30 March 1982 in Trescore Balneario) is an Italian professional football player. Currently, he plays for Monza.

Football career
On 3 July 2007, he was signed by Serie B side AlbinoLeffe in 3-year contract from Serie D side USO Calcio. In the first season, he wrote no.8 shirt.

On 30 January 2008, he was loaned to Serie C2 side Pavia. On 29 August 2008 he left for Lega Pro Prima Divisione side Monza.

Since the departure of Francesco Ruopolo and Marco Cellini, Torri had more chance to play. At the opening match of 2010-11 season, Torri partnered with Leandro Antonio Martínez and Karamoko Cissé, which Torri scored twice and Cissé scored once, helped AlbinoLeffe beat fellow Serie B club Pescara 3–1 in Coppa Italia.

On 2 September 2010, he signed a new 4-year contract with AlbinoLeffe.

On 21 August 2012, he joined Lumezzane on loan. But in January 2013, he left for Cuneo.

On 29 January 2014, goes to the Real Vicenza.

On 29 July 2014, goes to the Pro Piacenza.

On 14 January 2015, returns after six years at Monza

References

External links

aic.football.it

1982 births
Living people
Italian footballers
Serie B players
A.C. Milan players
Virtus Bergamo Alzano Seriate 1909 players
U.C. AlbinoLeffe players
F.C. Pavia players
A.C. Monza players
F.C. Lumezzane V.G.Z. A.S.D. players
A.C. Cuneo 1905 players
Association football forwards
Real Vicenza V.S. players
A.S.D. La Biellese players
Sportspeople from the Province of Bergamo
People from Trescore Balneario
Footballers from Lombardy